Anna Schønheyder  (28 August 1877 – 11 April 1927) was a Norwegian painter and textile artist.

Biography
She was born in Christiania (now Oslo), Norway to Diderik Christian Sommerschild Schønheyder and Marie Kathinka Maurer, and was married to engineer Wilhelm Andreas Hartmann.

She trained at the Norwegian National Academy of Craft and Art Industry under Johan Nordhagen during 1900 and in the period 1905–09. She was a student of Harriet Backer and Oluf Wold-Torne and in 1903–04 with Viggo Johansen and Joakim Skovgaard. Schønheyder made her debut at the Autumn Exhibition at Oslo in 1902.

She is represented in the National Gallery of Norway with the paintings Vågå kirke før gudstjenesten (c.1906) and Pikekammeret på Lye i Vågå (c.1907).

References

1877 births
1927 deaths
Artists from Oslo
19th-century Norwegian painters
20th-century Norwegian painters